Bryan Paul Carrasco Santos (born 31 January 1991) is a Chilean footballer who currently plays as a right winger for Chilean Primera División side Palestino.

Club career

Audax Italiano
Born and raised in Población José María Caro (located in Chile's capital city Santiago), Carrasco joined the youth ranks of the professional team Audax Italiano when he was 14 in 2005.

Carrasco made his professional debut, aged 18, during a Primera División game: a 2–2 draw with Huachipato on 18 September 2009 at Estadio Municipal de Concepción, where he was replaced by Fernando Gutiérrez. The same year, he played three games as starter for the Torneo Clausura: in the 2–2 draw with Huachipato, a 4–2 loss with Deportes La Serena and a 1–1 draw with O'Higgins.

His first goals for the club came on April 24, 2010, in a 3–1 victory over Universidad de Concepción at Estadio Bicentenario de La Florida for Primera División's thirteenth matchday, where he netted a twice. The same game, he was elected the man of the match.

In 2012, he was sent on loan to Croatia's top-level Dinamo Zagreb.

International career

Chile U20
In January 2011, Carrasco was nominated by César Vaccia to play for the Chilean under-20 team the 2011 South American Youth Championship in Peru, and debuted as a starter against the host team and scored one goal in a 2–0 victory at Estadio Monumental Virgen de Chapi. He gained notoriety for an incident during Chile's 1-0 loss to Ecuador in the final group's last match, in which he grabbed Ecuador forward Edson Montaño's arm and swung it into his face in his successful attempt to gain a free kick.

Senior Team
On April 11, 2012, he scored in a 3–0 friendly win over Peru at Estadio Jorge Basadre.

International goals

References

External links

1991 births
Living people
People from Santiago
People from Santiago Province, Chile
People from Santiago Metropolitan Region
Footballers from Santiago
Chilean footballers
Chile international footballers
Chile youth international footballers
Chile under-20 international footballers
Chilean expatriate footballers
Chilean Primera División players
Segunda División Profesional de Chile players
Audax Italiano footballers
Club Deportivo Palestino footballers
Croatian Football League players
GNK Dinamo Zagreb players
Liga MX players
C.D. Veracruz footballers
Expatriate footballers in Croatia
Chilean expatriate sportspeople in Croatia
Chilean expatriates in Croatia
Expatriate footballers in Mexico
Chilean expatriate sportspeople in Mexico
Chilean expatriates in Mexico
Association football wingers